The Chalfont Viaduct (also known as the Misbourne Viaduct) is the first of two five-arch brick railway viaducts on the Chiltern Main Line in south-east England. The M25 motorway passes beneath it between junctions 16 and 17 at Gerrards Cross near Chalfont St Peter, from where the bridge gets its name. The bridge is known as Chalfont No. 1 Viaduct; the longer Chalfont No. 2 Viaduct is a short distance to the west and spans the A413.

The bridge is noted as a local landmark because for many years it bore a graffiti slogan, "" painted in large white letters on the south-facing parapet.

Construction 

The Chalfont Viaduct is built of blue and black engineering brick with additional decorative brickwork. It was designed by James Charles Inglis, chief civil engineer of the GWR, and assistant engineer Robert Cherry Sikes.

In the mid-1980s the construction of the M25 motorway required the Misbourne to be diverted via underground concrete culverts. The route of the motorway was aligned to pass through the arches of the Chalfont Viaduct, leaving the viaduct largely unaltered apart from the raised ground level and the addition of concrete supports and crash barriers. The viaduct is the only brick-built bridge on this section of the M25.

Graffiti 

For many years the Chalfont Viaduct bore a graffiti slogan, "" painted in large white letters on the south-facing parapet, visible to M25 drivers heading in a clockwise direction. The north side of the bridge bears the painted legend "".

Originally, the graffiti on the south parapet simply read "". It is thought that "Peas" was the tag of a London graffiti artist which can be seen on other locations. The altered slogan may refer to the artist being repeatedly arrested, and it may also be a play on words in reference to John Lennon's popular 1969 song, "Give Peace a Chance".

The graffiti became a popular local landmark and was regarded affectionately by motorists and residents in nearby settlements as a reassuring location marker. In 2018, when the graffiti was partially removed and altered by an unknown artist to read "", it prompted mass media commentary which lead to the new artist returning a few days later to change the slogan to "". It has been speculated that the new graffiti may be related to similar slogans being painted on buildings in the London borough of Harrow, and several other bridges along the M25 and M1 motorways all following the similar, heavily serif-ed  style/typeface. The reception towards this modification was largely negative, to the point that a petition to Network Rail to reinstate the previous slogan and make the bridge a listed building was produced, and received over 2,000 signatures.

In March 2020 during the coronavirus pandemic, an unknown artist replaced the graffiti with one reading "".

The north side of the bridge, visible to drivers going in an anticlockwise direction was tagged with graffiti from Extinction Rebellion..

See also 

 Gerrards Cross Tunnel

References 
Citations

Sources

External links 

 Postcard of the Misbourne Viaduct c. 1905
 Photograph of the viaduct crossing the River Misbourne c. 1903
 The Misbourne Viaduct under construction c. 1903
 The Misbourne Viaduct under construction c. 1903

Railway bridges in Buckinghamshire
Bridges completed in 1906
M25 motorway
Arch bridges in the United Kingdom
Gerrards Cross
Great Western Railway
Great Central Railway
Transport in Buckinghamshire
Graffiti in England
1906 establishments in England